Micropterix elegans is a species of moth belonging to the family Micropterigidae that was described by Stainton in 1867, and is endemic to Israel.

References

Micropterigidae
Endemic fauna of Israel
Moths described in 1867
Moths of the Middle East
Taxa named by Henry Tibbats Stainton